Born Free Entertainment is an Indian motion picture production company, based in Mumbai. The company was founded in 2011 by Bollywood actress Dia Mirza and director Sahil Sangha. The company's film production Bobby Jasoos, which stars Vidya Balan and Ali Fazal in the leading roles, was released in 2014.

Filmography

References

External links 
Official Website 
Facebook
Twitter

Film production companies based in Mumbai
Entertainment companies established in 2011
2011 establishments in Maharashtra